Filip Habr (born ) is a Czech male volleyball player. He is part of the Czech Republic men's national volleyball team. On club level he plays for VK Ceske Budejovice.

References

External links
 profile at FIVB.org

1988 births
Living people
Czech men's volleyball players
Place of birth missing (living people)